Holishkes (also holipches or huluptzes or prokes or gefilte kroit) is a traditional Jewish cabbage roll dish. Holishkes are prepared from  blanched cabbage leaves wrapped in a parcel-like manner around minced meat and then simmered in tomato sauce. Sometimes rice is added to the meat filling. While the dish is eaten all year round, it is customarily served on Sukkot to symbolize a bountiful harvest, and on Simchat Torah because two stuffed cabbage rolls placed side by side resemble Torah scrolls.

History
Jews in the Russian Empire and north-eastern Poland adapted holishkes from a dish served by the Slavs while Jews in Hungary and the Balkans learned it from their Slavic and Romanian neighbors (cf. sarma). Eastern European Jews called it "golub" (dove), because the rolled cabbage in sauce resembled a bird in a nest. The spicing varies by community. Hungarian Jews use a dash of marjoram; Syrians add cinnamon; Persians add dill and mint. As meat was expensive, rice was added to extend the meat.

See also
 Jewish cuisine
 Gołąbki, a similar Polish dish
 List of cabbage dishes

References

External links
 Cabbage Rolls (Holishkes) Recipe | Recipezaar. "Where the World's Recipes Are".
 Holishkes (stuffed Cabbage) Recipe at Epicurious.com. Recipes, Menus, Cooking Articles & Food Guides.
 Stuffed Cabbage: Holishkes - meat. Mimi's Cyber-Kitchen Recipes - "Your First Stop for Food on the Web".

Ashkenazi Jewish cuisine
Stuffed vegetable dishes
Cabbage dishes